Anne Legendre Armstrong (December 27, 1927 – July 30, 2008) was a United States diplomat and politician. She was the first woman to serve as Counselor to the President and as United States Ambassador to the United Kingdom, serving in those capacities under the Ford, Nixon, and Carter administrations. She was the recipient of the Presidential Medal of Freedom in 1987.

Biography 
She was born in New Orleans, Louisiana, and was graduated from Vassar College in 1949. In 1950, she married Tobin Armstrong and moved to Kenedy County, Texas. From 1966 to 1968, she was the vice chairman of the Texas Republican Party. From 1971 to 1973, she was co-chairman of the Republican National Committee, and she was the keynote speaker at the 1972 Republican National Convention. (She was the first woman from either major party to keynote at a national convention.) In a Christmas dinner toast at the White House on Dec. 16, 1972, she "in one breath" praised "'Jesus Christ, the Prince of Peace'" and Nixon as "the man who has done the most for peace in our history"; at the time, Nixon had given orders for the Christmas Bombing of North Vietnam. Nixon named her as Counselor to the President on December 19, 1972, which she held from January 19, 1973 to November 1974 under President Ford. 

During her tenure as Counselor, Armstrong founded the first Office of Women's Programs in the White House, predecessor to the current White House Council on Women and Girls. Fluent in Spanish, she was Nixon's liaison to Hispanic Americans and was a member of a Cabinet committee on opportunities for Spanish-speaking people. 

In 1973, a young Karl Rove, then on his way to becoming the chairman of the College Republicans, suggested in a memorandum to Armstrong that the Republican Party show nonpolitical films (such as John Wayne movies and Reefer Madness) at College Republican clubs as part of a strategy to raise support for the party among students and for fundraising.

From 1976 to 1977, Armstrong was the first woman United States Ambassador to the United Kingdom. At the 1976 Republican National Convention in Kansas City, Missouri, there was a draft effort to put Armstrong on the ticket as the vice presidential nominee with incumbent President Gerald Ford. Senator Robert Dole of Kansas was instead chosen by Ford. In 1978, Armstrong supported George W. Bush in his successful primary challenge to Jim Reese in their congressional runoff primary in Texas's 19th congressional district. 
Bush, however, lost the general election that fall to then-Democrat Kent Hance.

In 1987, Armstrong was given the Presidential Medal of Freedom by Ronald Reagan. In 1989, she received the Golden Plate Award of the American Academy of Achievement. She received an honorary Doctor of Laws from St. Mary's University in 1978.

In addition to her public life, Armstrong served on the boards of many U.S. corporations, including American Express, Boise Cascade, Halliburton, and General Motors. She served on the board of non profit organizations such as Center for Strategic and International Studies and was a member of the Founding Council of the Rothermere American Institute, and the University of Oxford.

Death
Armstrong died of cancer at a hospice in Houston in 2008. She is buried at Oakwood Cemetery, Austin, Texas.

References

External links 
 Brief biography from the Gerald R. Ford Library
 Brief biography on Seven Revolutions site
 A Few Good Women... The Honorable Anne Legendre Armstrong

|-

|-

|-

|-

|-

1927 births
2008 deaths
Ambassadors of the United States to the United Kingdom
American expatriates in England
American women ambassadors
Deaths from cancer in Texas
Ford administration cabinet members
Nixon administration cabinet members
Politicians from New Orleans
Presidential Medal of Freedom recipients
Ranchers from Texas
Texas Republicans
Vassar College alumni
Women in Texas politics
Women members of the Cabinet of the United States
20th-century American diplomats